Goofy's Fun House is a 2001 platform game released for the PlayStation. It focuses on the Disney character, Goofy.

Synopsis 
Goofy must explore each part of his home, which consists of 15 distinct rooms. Each room includes elements, such as a blender in the kitchen or table saw in the garage, that the player can interact with. The main focus of play centers around collecting the 60 film canisters and certain objects, which Goofy has misplaced throughout his home. In addition to this, there are several mini-games that may be accessed via the paintings in the rec room of Goofy's house if the player finds all of the objects that are needed. The mini-games can range from golf and fishing to skiing and driving (based on How to play...). There are also certain objects that can come alive and "attack" Goofy such as a rumbling washing machine, a vacuum cleaner, and a lawn mower.

After Goofy completes each mini-game and finds a few special items found somewhere in the house, a corresponding cartoon, one of which is How to Play Golf, will be unlocked. The game is considered "Completed" when the player completes all of the mini-games, finds all of the cartoon-specific items, and collects all 60 film canisters, unlocking the final cartoon.

Reception 

Goofy's Fun House received mainly positive reviews. GameSpot rated the game a 7.4 out of 10 stars, while IGN rated the game a 7.5 out of 10. GameRankings.com rated the game an 89.33%.

References

External links 
 http://www.gamefaqs.com/ps/578875-disneys-goofys-fun-house

2001 video games
PlayStation (console) games
PlayStation (console)-only games
Goofy (Disney) video games
Video games about dogs
Ubisoft games
Video games developed in the United Kingdom
NewKidCo games
Single-player video games